Weltin Wolfinger (12 May 1926 – 15 July 2010) was a Liechtensteiner bobsledder. He competed in the two-man event at the 1956 Winter Olympics.

References

1926 births
2010 deaths
Liechtenstein male bobsledders
Olympic bobsledders of Liechtenstein
Bobsledders at the 1956 Winter Olympics
People from Montreux